Sir Francis Winnington (7 November 1634 – 1 May 1700) was an English lawyer and politician who sat in the House of Commons at various times between 1677 and 1698. He became Solicitor-General to King Charles II.

Biography
Winnington entered the Middle Temple in 1656 and was called to the bar in 1660 and rose steadily, serving as counsel in various Parliamentary impeachments.  In January 1672, he became attorney-general to the king's brother, the Duke of York and was knighted on 16 December 1672. He was appointed as Solicitor General in 1675 and chosen as MP for Windsor at a by-election to the Cavalier Parliament in 1677 on the King's recommendation.

During the hysteria of the Popish Plot, Winnington's allegiances changed, and he participated in impeaching the Lord Danby.  This led to his dismissal as Solicitor General.  However he was elected as MP for Worcester in 1679 (twice) and again in 1681.  While Parliament was not sitting, he defended political allies in the court and also the city he represented when its corporation was attacked by Quo warranto proceedings, as well as Oxford.  His legal services remained in demand in the reign of James II of England.  He was elected as MP for Tewkesbury in 1689, 1692 and 1695, though he had not initially sought the seat.

Family
Winnington  married first Elizabeth Herbert of Powick, he had a daughter Elizabeth who married in 1676 Richard Dowdeswell of Bushbury MP, his colleague in the representation of Tewkesbury.

Winnington second and last marriage was to Elizabeth, daughter of Edward Salwey and third and youngest sister and coheir of Edward Salwey, who brought him Stanford Court at Stanford-on-Teme, Worcestershire to add to property he had already bought there with his considerable earnings. They had four sons and three daughters, including Salwey Winnington, Francis Winnington and Edward Winnington, later Jeffreys.

Notes

References

Attribution

1634 births
1700 deaths
English lawyers
Knights Bachelor
Solicitors General for England and Wales
English MPs 1661–1679
Members of the Middle Temple
17th-century English lawyers
English MPs 1679
English MPs 1680–1681
English MPs 1681
English MPs 1690–1695
English MPs 1695–1698
Politicians from Worcestershire
Politicians from Gloucestershire